The 2013 Colonial Athletic Association men's basketball tournament was held March 9–11 at the Richmond Coliseum in Richmond, VA. The champion, James Madison, received an automatic bid to the 2013 NCAA tournament. 

The 2013 tournament featured only seven teams due to UNC-Wilmington and Towson ineligible for postseason play as a result of low APR scores, and Old Dominion and Georgia State being banned from the CAA tournament due to bylaws that deny access to championships that provide automatic NCAA bids to schools that have announced they will depart the league. Old Dominion and Georgia State were still eligible for an at-large bid to other postseason tournaments.

Seeds

Schedule

Bracket

All times listed are Eastern

Game summaries

References

Colonial Athletic Association men's basketball tournament
Tournament
CAA men's basketball tournament
CAA men's basketball tournament
Basketball competitions in Richmond, Virginia
College basketball tournaments in Virginia